Ra is the Sun-god of Ancient Egypt.

Ra or RA may also refer to:

Arts and entertainment

Film and television
 Ra (Stargate), a character from the film Stargate, based on the Egyptian god
 Ra (1972 film), a 1972 documentary film about Thor Heyerdahl's expeditions
 Ra (2014 film), a Tamil fantasy film

Gaming
 Rocket Arena, a Quake mod
 Command & Conquer: Red Alert, a game

Music
 A half-step below Re on the solfège musical scale

Performers
 Ra (American band), an American rock band
 Ra (artist), the pseudonym of Raoul Sinier, a French digital painter and electronic musician
 R.A. the Rugged Man (born c. 1974), American rapper
 Sun Ra (1914–1993), American jazz musician and philosopher
 Rise Against, an American punk/hardcore band

Albums
 Ra (Utopia album), 1977
 Ra (Eloy album), 1988

Songs
 "Ra", a song by Northlane from Node, 2015
 Ra (Inna song), 2018

Other media
 Ra (board game), a board game for two to five players designed by Reiner Knizia and based on ancient Egyptian culture
 Resident Advisor, an online magazine

Businesses and organizations

Academia
 Resource Academia, an academic institution in Lahore, Pakistan
 Roosevelt Academy, a college in the Netherlands
 Royal Academy of Arts, in London, UK
 Royal Academician, one of the 80 practicing artists elected as a member of the Royal Academy
 Resident assistant, a student leader

Government, military, and political organizations
 Regular Army, the permanent force of an army that is maintained during peacetime
 Regulatory affairs, a department in charge of industry-government relations
 Provisional Irish Republican Army, an Irish nationalist terrorist group
 Resettlement Administration, a New Deal government program in the United States
 Royal Artillery, a regiment of the British Army

Other businesses and organizations
 Ramblers' Association, a UK organisation for walkers
Registration authority, a body which maintains lists of international standards codes
 Rowing Australia, governing body for the sport of rowing in Australia
 Road America, which uses the logo "RA"; a racetrack in Wisconsin, USA
 Nepal Airlines (IATA code RA)

Linguistics 
 Ra (Javanese) (ꦫ), a letter in the Javanese script
 Ra (kana), the Japanese kana ら and ラ
 ረ and ራ, Amharic letters that can be read as variations of ra, also related to the Semitic resh
 Resh or rāʾ, 10th letter of Arabic alphabet
 Ռ or ṙa, the 28th letter in the Armenian alphabet
 र, ड़', ढ़, and र्ह, Devanagari letters which can be called ra, ṛa or rha
 Ԗ, the 23rd letter rha («ра») in the older (1924−1927) Moksha language Cyrillic script
 ர and ற, Tamil letters articulated as ra, tra or dra depending on the consonant complex

Places 
 Ra (island) (or Rah), a small island of Vanuatu
 Ra Province in Fiji
 Ra (Fijian Communal Constituency, Fiji)
 Ra (Open Constituency, Fiji)
 Republic of Armenia
 Rawlins County, Kansas, of which the largest city is Atwood

Religion and mythology
 Ra, the Sun-god of Ancient Egypt
 Rå, a creature in Scandinavian mythology
 Rā, a Māori word for the Sun
 Roua or Ra, a Polynesian deity
 Tama-nui-te-rā, a Maori Sun-god
 Radeyallāhu ′Anhu, an Islamic honorific.

Science and technology

Biology and medicine
 Retinoic acid, a metabolite of vitamin A
 Retrograde amnesia, a form of amnesia
 Rheumatoid arthritis, a chronic, systemic inflammatory disorder that attacks synovial joints
Refractory anemia, an expression of myelodysplasia

Computing
 .ra, the file extension for RealAudio files
 Registration authority, in public key cryptography
 RemoteAccess, a BBS software program
 Route Advertisement, in networking, part of the Neighbor Discovery Protocol

Transportation
 SJ Ra, a Swedish locomotive
 Radar altimeter, an instrument on aircraft
 Resolution Advisory, an aircraft instruction from a Traffic Collision Avoidance System

Other uses in science and technology
 , a popular parameter of roughness, defined as the average of absolute values of deviation from the mean of a surface
 Color rendering index, a measure of the ability of a light source to reveal the colors of objects faithfully
 Radium, symbol Ra, a chemical element
 Rain (METAR weather code RA)
 Rayleigh number, in physics
 Relation algebra, a type of mathematical structure
 Right ascension, in astronomy
 Risk analysis, in several fields
 Resource adequacy, in electrical power grids

People with the surname
Armen Ra, Iranian-born American musician
Aron Ra, American author, podcaster, and atheist activist
Ed Ra (born 1981), American politician

Other uses
 Ra I and Ra II, reed boats used by Thor Heyerdahl's transatlantic expeditions
 Registered Architect, as a post-nominal suffix
 Remittance advice, a letter sent by a customer to a supplier, to inform the supplier that their invoice has been paid
 Resident assistant, in college housing
 Republic Act, Philippine laws from 1946 to 1972 and after 1987
 One of several ISO 217 standard paper sizes
 "Ra", a disc golf midrange disc by Infinite Discs

See also 
 RAH (disambiguation)
 RHA (disambiguation)
 RAS (disambiguation)
 Ras (disambiguation)

ar:Ra (توضيح)
cs:RA
de:RA
fr:RA
ko:RA
id:RA
it:RA
sw:RA
ja:RA
no:Ra
sl:RA
tl:RA
zh:RA